RugbyFest 1990 (officially the "Women's World Rugby Festival") was a two-week festival of women's rugby, held in Christchurch, New Zealand between 19 August and 1 September 1990. The event has been inflated sometimes to the status of a mini-world cup. In reality with only four teams taking part, and lacking major nations such as France, England and Canada, it was never that. However it was still a significant step forward – the first ever world-wide multi-regional women's rugby tournament. Held only eight years after the first women's international it was a sign of how much the game had already expanded.

Status of RugbyFest internationals

Teams from Asia, North America and Europe took part alongside local sides in a series of 15-a-side fixtures. Participants included four "national" teams (originally there were to have been five, but Japan withdrew) and featured what are held by many to be the first internationals ever played by New Zealand and USSR/Russia.

In practice, there is some dispute about how "official" the national teams were, not least because in some cases there was not yet a national women's governing body to grant official status.

For example, the USA RFU considers all games by the USA team against "national" XVs at the tournament to be official "tests" whereas the New Zealand (or at least the New Zealand rugby almanack) lists the games as unofficial "New Zealand XV" fixtures - but includes data from the tournament in its official player statistics.

As the IRB provides no official ruling or listing of women's rugby internationals (the only list of any sort appears here), it can only be for the reader to decide on the status of these games.

"International" fixtures

Final table

Results

Other "national team" fixtures
The festival also included a number of games between the "national" teams and local sides. Results were:

:

:

:

See also
 Women's Rugby World Cup
 Women's international rugby union
 1988 Women's Rugby European Cup (first women's international rugby tournament)
 1982 Netherlands v France women's rugby match (first women's international rugby match)

References

Official unpublished scoresheets held in the collections of the Rugby Museum of New Zealand

1990 rugby union tournaments for national teams
International women's rugby union competitions hosted by New Zealand
1990 in New Zealand rugby union
1990 in women's rugby union
August 1990 sports events in New Zealand
September 1990 sports events in New Zealand
1990 in American women's sports
1990 in Dutch sport
1990 in Soviet sport
rugby union